Komańcza  (Komancha) is a village in the Sanok County, in the Subcarpathian Voivodeship (province) of south-eastern Poland. It is situated in the Bukowsko Upland mountains, located near the towns of Medzilaborce and Palota (in northeastern Slovakia).

Etymology
According to some sources its name comes from the east Slavic dialect word Kuman (кумани), meaning "village of Cumans".

History
The village was first mentioned in historical records in 1512 as Crziemyenna, and in 1524 as Komancza. In 1785, the village lands comprised , with a population of 450 Greek Catholics, 16 Roman Catholics,  and 15 Jews. After World War I, the village was the site of the ephemeral Komancza Republic (November 1918 – January 1919). In 1936, the Greek Catholic population increased to 878. In 1945 the Ukrainian parish priest, Orest Venhrynovych, was murdered by the Poles, and in 1946 the village was burned down ] when many local citizens were forcibly deported to the Ukrainian Soviet Socialist Republic. Others were removed from Komancza on 29 April 1947 as part of Operation Vistula and moved to the Silesian area of Poland.

Culture and religion
The wooden village church, "Patronage of the Blessed Virgin Mary", is considered a pearl of Eastern Lemko architecture. It was built in 1802, and was on the Polish Register of Historic Buildings. The church was occupied by the Greek Catholics until 1963, when it was taken over by the Orthodox. Uniate (Greek Catholic) services were then held in a Roman Catholic Chapel, until a new Uniate church was built in 1987.  The old wooden church was totally destroyed by fire on 13 September 2006, but the belfry is still standing.  A number of liturgical books, dated from 1638 to 1793, were also severely damaged or destroyed in the fire.

Filial churches are located in Czystohorb ( away) and Dołżyca.

Hiking trail
 European walking route E8
 Prešov - Miháľov - Kurimka - Dukla - Iwonicz-Zdrój – Rymanów-Zdrój - Puławy – Tokarnia – Kamień – Komańcza - Cisna - Ustrzyki Górne - Tarnica - Wołosate.

See also
 Pogorzans
 Lemkos

References

External links
 
 Twoje Bieszczady (in Polish)

Villages in Sanok County